The Silver Kookaburra is a silver bullion coin originating from Australia, and produced at the Perth Mint starting in 1990. The coins were .999 fine silver until the 2018 edition, which increased in purity to .9999 silver. While the obverse of the coin always depicts Queen Elizabeth II, the reverse side changes every year, always featuring a kookaburra, a bird native to Australia. Due to the yearly design change and limited production of the one-ounce coins, they have higher collectible value than some other bullion coins. The Perth Mint generally ships the coins in individual plastic capsules. One-ounce coins ship in shrink wrap rolls of 20, with 5 rolls in each box of 100. They are minted in four sizes; 1000g, 10, 2 and 1 troy ounces.

To commemorate the 25th anniversary of the kookaburra coin, the 2015 coin features the same image of the kookaburra as the original 1990 coin. To differentiate the 1990 and 2015 coins the date on the reverse reads 1990-2015 and 2015 has been added to the obverse. The 2015 coin had a release date of September 1, 2014.

Specifications

One Ounce History

The maximum mintage of the one troy ounce coin is capped, while the others have unlimited mintage based on demand. Perth Mint originally intended to expand the 2013 mintage to one million coins, however, they later reduced this number to 500,000 and declared that future years would continue to be limited to this amount. In addition to the annual design change, there is also a design change between the bullion and proof versions of the coin each year.  No proof coins were minted between 2006-2011; however, there was a 1-ounce silver proof Kookaburra colored coin struck in 2012 for the Discover Australia coin series. Since 2012, the proof coin has been struck in high relief only.

Special editions such as privy marked, colored, and gilded are often available.

See also
 Australian Silver Kangaroo (bullion)
 Australian Silver Koala
 Bullion
 Bullion coin
 Inflation hedge
 Silver as an investment

References
 General
 2020 Standard Catalog of World Coins - 1901–2000, 47th Edition, publication date 2019, Krause Publications, 
 2020 Standard Catalog of World Coins - 2001–Date, 14th Edition, publication date 2019, Krause Publications, 

Specific

Bullion coins of Australia
Silver bullion coins